Dauciconus is a subgenus  of sea snails, marine gastropod mollusks in the genus Conus,  family Conidae, the cone snails and their allies.

In the new classification of the family Conidae by Puillandre N., Duda T.F., Meyer C., Olivera B.M. & Bouchet P. (2015), Dauciconus has become a subgenus of Conus: Conus (Dauciconus) Tucker & Tenorio, 2013 represented as Conus Linnaeus, 1758

Distinguishing characteristics
The Tucker & Tenorio 2009 taxonomy distinguishes Dauciconus from Conus in the following ways:

 Genus Conus sensu stricto Linnaeus, 1758
 Shell characters (living and fossil species)
The basic shell shape is conical to elongated conical, has a deep anal notch on the shoulder, a smooth periostracum and a small operculum. The shoulder of the shell is usually nodulose and the protoconch is usually multispiral. Markings often include the presence of tents except for black or white color variants, with the absence of spiral lines of minute tents and textile bars.
Radular tooth (not known for fossil species)
The radula has an elongated anterior section with serrations and a large exposed terminating cusp, a non-obvious waist, blade is either small or absent and has a short barb, and lacks a basal spur.
Geographical distribution
These species are found in the Indo-Pacific region.
Feeding habits
These species eat other gastropods including cones.

 Genus Dauciconus Cotton, 1945
Shell characters (living and fossil species)
The shell is conical to elongate conical in shape.  The protoconch is multispiral with 2.5 whorls, and the whorl tops are often concave and nodules usually do not persist on later whorls.  The anal notch is deep to moderately deep. The periostracum is tufted, and the operculum is small to medium sized.
Radular tooth (not known for fossil species)
The anterior section of the radula is roughly equal to the posterior section.  The blade is fairly long and covers at least half the length of the anterior section of the radular tooth.  A basal spur is present, and the barb is short.  The radular tooth has serrations and the terminating cusp is internal.
Geographical distribution
These species are found in the West Atlantic and Eastern Pacific regions.
Feeding habits
These species are presumed to be vermivorous (meaning that they prey on marine worms) based upon the aspect of the radular tooth.

Species list
The following species names are recognized as "alternate representations" (see full explanation below) in contrast to the traditional system, which uses the genus Conus for all species in the family:
 Dauciconus abrolhosensis Petuch, 1987: synonym of Conus (Dauciconus) abrolhosensis Petuch, 1987, represented as Conus abrolhosensis Petuch, 1987 
 Dauciconus alainallaryi Bozzetti & Monnier, 2009: synonym of Conus (Dauciconus) alainallaryi Bozzetti & Monnier, 2009, represented as Conus alainallaryi Bozzetti & Monnier, 2009
 Dauciconus amphiurgus (Dall, 1889): synonym of  Conus amphiurgus Dall, 1889
 Dauciconus anabathrum (Crosse, 1865): synonym of Conus anabathrum Crosse, 1865
 Dauciconus arangoi Sarasúa, 1977: synonym of Conus (Dauciconus) arangoi Sarasúa, 1977, represented as Conus arangoi Sarasúa, 1977
 Dauciconus aureonimbosus (Petuch, 1987): synonym of Conus aureonimbosus Petuch, 1987
 Dauciconus bayeri Petuch, 1987: synonym of Conus (Dauciconus) bayeri Petuch, 1987, represented as Conus bayeri Petuch, 1987
 Daucionus belizeanus (Petuch & Sargent, 2011): synonym of Conus (Dauciconus) belizeanus (Petuch & Sargent, 2011), represented as Conus belizeanus (Petuch & Sargent, 2011) 
 Dauciconus bessei Petuch, 1992: synonym of Conus (Dauciconus) bessei Petuch, 1992, represented as Conus bessei Petuch, 1992 
 Dauciconus boui (da Motta, 1988): synonym of Conus (Dauciconus) boui da Motta, 1988 represented as Conus boui da Motta, 1988
 Dauciconus burryae (Clench, 1942): synonym of Conus anabathrum burryae Clench, 1942: synonym of Conus burryae Clench, 1942
 Dauciconus colombi Monnier & Limpalaër, 2012: synonym of Conus (Dauciconus) colombi (Monnier & Limpalaër, 2012) represented as Conus colombi (Monnier & Limpalaër, 2012)
 Dauciconus daucus (Hwass in Bruguière, 1792): synonym of  Conus daucus Hwass in Bruguière, 1792
 Dauciconus eversoni (Petuch, 1987): synonym of  Conus eversoni Petuch, 1987
 Dauciconus fenzani Petuch & Sargent, 2011: synonym of Conasprella fenzani (Petuch & Sargent, 2011)
 Dauciconus flammeacolor (Petuch, 1992): synonym of  Conus flammeacolor Petuch, 1992
 Dauciconus glicksteini (Petuch, 1987): synonym of  Conus glicksteini Petuch, 1987
 Dauciconus goajira (Petuch, 1992): synonym of Conus (Dauciconus) goajira Petuch, 1992 represented as Conus goajira Petuch, 1992
 Dauciconus hennequini (Petuch, 1993): synonym of Conus (Dauciconus) hennequini Petuch, 1993 represented as Conus hennequini Petuch, 1993
 Dauciconus honkeri (Petuch, 1988): synonym of  Conus honkeri Petuch, 1988
 Dauciconus jorioi Petuch, 2013: synonym of Conus (Dauciconus) jorioi (Petuch, 2013) represented as Conus jorioi (Petuch, 2013)
 Dauciconus kaiserae Tenorio, Tucker & Chaney, 2012: synonym of Conus (Dauciconus) kaiserae (Tenorio, Tucker & Chaney, 2012) represented as Conus kaiserae (Tenorio, Tucker & Chaney, 2012)
 Dauciconus lightbourni (Petuch, 1986): synonym of  Conus lightbourni Petuch, 1986
 Dauciconus maya (Petuch & Sargent, 2011): synonym of Conus (Dauciconus) maya (Petuch & Sargent, 2011) represented as Conus maya (Petuch & Sargent, 2011)
 Dauciconus parascalaris (Petuch, 1987): synonym of  Conus parascalaris Petuch, 1987
 Dauciconus poormani (Berry, 1968): synonym of  Conus poormani Berry, 1968
 Dauciconus portobeloensis (Petuch, 1990): synonym of  Conus portobeloensis Petuch, 1990
 Dauciconus poulosi (Petuch, 1993): synonym of  Conus poulosi Petuch, 1993
 Dauciconus sanderi (Wils & Moolenbeek, 1979): synonym of  Conus sanderi Wils & Moolenbeek, 1979
 Dauciconus shaskyi Tenorio, Tucker & Chaney, 2012: synonym of Conus (Dauciconus) shaskyi (Tenorio, Tucker & Chaney, 2012) represented as Conus shaskyi (Tenorio, Tucker & Chaney, 2012)
 Dauciconus vikingorum (Petuch, 1993): synonym of Conus (Dauciconus) vikingorum Petuch, 1993 represented as Conus vikingorum Petuch, 1993
 Dauciconus virgatus (Reeve, 1849): synonym of  Conus virgatus Reeve, 1849
 Dauciconus worki (Petuch, 1998): synonym of  Conus worki Petuch, 1998
 Dauciconus xanthicus (Dall, 1910): synonym of  Conus xanthicus Dall, 1910

References

Further reading 
 Kohn A. A. (1992). Chronological Taxonomy of Conus, 1758-1840". Smithsonian Institution Press, Washington and London.
 Monteiro A. (ed.) (2007). The Cone Collector 1: 1-28.
 Berschauer D. (2010). Technology and the Fall of the Mono-Generic Family The Cone Collector 15: pp. 51-54
 Puillandre N., Meyer C.P., Bouchet P., and Olivera B.M. (2011), Genetic divergence and geographical variation in the deep-water Conus orbignyi complex (Mollusca: Conoidea)'', Zoologica Scripta 40(4) 350-363.

External links
 To World Register of Marine Species
  Gastropods.com: Conidae setting forth the genera recognized therein.

Conidae
Gastropod subgenera